Trox variolatus is a beetle of the family Trogidae, the hide beetles. It is found in North America.

References

variolatus
Beetles of North America
Taxa named by Frederick Ernst Melsheimer
Beetles described in 1846